Jon Clark (born April 11, 1973) is a former American football offensive tackle who played four seasons in the National Football League (NFL) for the Chicago Bears and Arizona Cardinals. He went to college at Temple.

Early life
Jon Clark was born on April 11, 1973 in Philadelphia, Pennsylvania. He went to high school at John Bartram (PA).

College
He went to college at Temple.

Professional career

Jon Clark was drafted in the 6th round (187th pick) by the Chicago Bears. In his rookie season he only played in one game. In his second season he played in one game because of injuries to the offensive line. Then he went to the Cardinals in 1998 and played in 6 games. He also was in two playoff games. In 1999 he played in 2 games.  He was on the Cardinals in 2000 but did not appear in any games.

References

1973 births
Chicago Bears players
Arizona Cardinals players
Players of American football from Pennsylvania
American football offensive tackles
Temple Owls football players
Living people